Algestone acetonide (developmental code name W-3395), also known as algestone 16α,17α-acetonide or 16α,17α-isopropylidenedioxyprogesterone, is a progestin which was never marketed. It is the acetonide cyclic ketal of algestone. Another progestin, algestone acetophenide, in contrast, has been marketed.

Chemistry

References

Abandoned drugs
Acetonides
Diketones
Pregnanes
Progestogens
Steroid cyclic ketals